Judy Shih-Hwa Liu is the Sidney A. Fox and Dorothea Doctors Fox Professor of Ophthalmology and Neuroscience at Brown University. She works on the cortical malformations that cause epilepsy.

Education and early career 
Liu earned a Bachelor of Science at Yale University. She moved to New York for her graduate studies, and completed a PhD and MD at Albert Einstein College of Medicine. After her MD she completed a medical internship in internal medicine at Beth Israel Deaconess Medical Center. She was appointed as a neurological resident at Beth Israel in 2001.

Research 
Liu studies epilepsy which arises from focal cortical dysplasia. She investigates the surgically removed tissues and found that they are influenced by circadian rhythm. The protein CLOCK (Circadian Locomotor Output Cycles Kaput)  is a transcription factor that is important in regulating circadian rhythm in the suprachiasmatic nucleus. Liu analysed the transcriptome of surgically removed tissues and found differences in the RNA of CLOCK. They created mouse models, one with neurons defunct in CLOCK and the other with neurons lacking inhibitory cells. The mice without limited CLOCK suffered from epilepsy similar to humans. In 2017 she was awarded a Citizens United for Research in Epilepsy award to study the molecular CLOCK and sleep-associated seizures. She contributed to the 2012 book Jasper's Basic Mechanisms of the Epilepsies.

She was awarded the Brain & Behavior Research Foundation NASRAD Young Investigator Award and a Whitehall Foundation grant to study the cell biology that underlies the development of axons.  In 2013 she was awarded a grant to study the molecular mechanisms that prevent the initiation of seizures. The grant looks to identify the changes in mRNA and microRNA in people who suffer from cortical dysplasia and tuberous sclerosis.

References 

Living people
Brown University faculty
Yale University alumni
Albert Einstein College of Medicine alumni
American neuroscientists
American women neuroscientists
Year of birth missing (living people)
American women academics
21st-century American women